Some titles of nobility outside Europe may be considered as equivalents of Duke.

Like other major Western noble titles, Duke is sometimes used to render (translate) certain titles in non-western languages. "Duke" is used even though those titles are generally etymologically and often historically unrelated and thus hard to compare. However, they are considered roughly equivalent, especially in hierarchic aristocracies such as feudal Japan, useful as an indication of relative rank.

China
In the most general of terms, （）was the hereditary title of nobility of the first rank, usually translated as Duke.
 
Under the Manchu (ruling ethnicity of the last imperial dynasty), there were ducal titles in both types of titled nobility.

Imperial family
Within the imperial family (extended, but limited; such systematic titulature is unknown in Europe) there were fourteen ranks, arranged in the following descending order: 
, Prince of the Blood of the first rank, usually conferred on the sons of Emperors by an Empress; 
, Prince of the Blood of the second rank, originally  or "Prince of the Gift", enjoying the style of His Imperial Highness, with a name or locality (hao) attached to the title and the right to a posthumous name (shi) after death, usually conferred on the sons of Emperors by Imperial Consorts; 
, Prince of the Blood of the third rank and enjoying the style of His Highness; 
, "Prince of the Banner", Prince of the Blood of the fourth rank, with the style of His Highness; 
, "defender duke": Prince of the Blood of the fifth rank with the style of His Highness; 
, "bulwark duke": Prince of the Blood of sixth rank, with the style of His Highness; only those six highest ranks carried the right to the eight privileges or Pa Fen 
to wear the purple button, 
to wear a three-eyed peacock's feather, 
to wear embroidered dragon plaque on court robes, 
to have red painted spears at the gates of their residences, 
to attach tassels to the accouterments of their horses, 
to use purple bridle-reins, 
to have a servant carry a special teapot, 
to have a special carpet on which to seat themselves. Below were: 
, "lesser defender duke not to encroach on the Eight Privileges", Prince of the Blood of the seventh rank with the style of His Excellency; 
, "lesser bulwark duke not to encroach on the Eight Privileges" Prince of the Blood of the eighth rank with the style of His Excellency; 
, Noble of the Imperial Lineage of the ninth rank, divided into three grades (or ); 
, Noble of the Imperial Lineage of the tenth rank, divided into three grades; 
 "supporter-general of the state", Noble of the Imperial Lineage of the eleventh rank, divided into three grades; 
, "general by grace", noble of the Imperial Lineage of the twelfth rank; 
, Imperial clansman, the usual rank for male descendants, in the male line, beyond the twelfth generation, entitled to wear an Imperial Yellow Girdle denoting their descent from Emperor Hsien Tsu; 
, collateral relatives of the Imperial clan, entitled to wear a distinctive Red Girdle denoting their descent from the collateral relatives of Emperor Hsien Tsu.

Non-imperial family
 (three classes, translated as Earl), 
 (three classes, translated as Viscount), 
 (three classes, translated as Baron), 
, 
, 
, 

All, except the ninth grade, were heritable for a specific number of generations, ranging from twenty-six generations for a first class Kung to one generation for a Yün Ch'i Yü. In certain instances, some titles were held by Right of Perpetual Inheritance .

Ethiopia

Japan
The highest-ranking of the fives titles of the kazoku, the hereditary peerage of Japan between 1869 and 1947, is rendered in Western languages either as prince or as duke.

Korea
In Goryeo Dynasty, there were two ranks similar to that of duke.

In Joseon Dynasty, there was no title that is equivalent to Duke.

Nigeria

In Yorubaland, a viceroyal chief is known as a Baale.

In the Sokoto Caliphate, a viceroyal chief is known as a Hakimi. He is often, but not necessarily, a relative of the reigning sultan or emir, and is commonly referred to as a district head in English.

Vietnam
Male members of the Imperial clan received, in addition to a birthright title by degree of parentage, one of nine senior titles of nobility:
  (King)
  (Grand Duke)
  (Duke)
  (Prince)
  (Marquis)
  (Count)
  (Viscount)
  (Baron)
  (noble)

References

Feudalism
Noble titles